"Running Away" is a single recorded by Hoobastank. It was the third single released from their self-titled debut album on April 1, 2002. The song peaked at number two on the US Billboard Modern Rock Tracks chart.

Music video
In the music video for "Running Away", Hoobastank appears playing on a background depicting a woman who tries to run away from their problems. It was directed by Paul Fedor.

Track listing
 "Running Away" (album version)
 "Running Away" (acoustic)
 "Up and Gone" (acoustic)
 "Open Your Eyes"

Charts

Release history

References

External links

2002 songs
2002 singles
Hoobastank songs
Island Records singles
Mercury Records singles
Songs written by Dan Estrin
Songs written by Doug Robb
Songs written by Chris Hesse